Udo Alozie Onwere (born 9 November 1971) is an English former professional footballer who played as a midfielder. Active between 1990 and 2000, Onwere made nearly 200 appearances in the Football League.

Career
Born in Hammersmith, Onwere began his career with the youth team Fulham. After making his professional debut for Fulham in 1990, Onwere later played in the Football League for Lincoln City, Blackpool and Barnet. Onwere also played non-League football for Dover Athletic, Aylesbury United, Hayes and Maidenhead United.

After retiring as a player in 2000, Onwere qualified as a lawyer.

References

External links

Lincoln City Archive

1971 births
Living people
English footballers
Fulham F.C. players
Lincoln City F.C. players
Dover Athletic F.C. players
Blackpool F.C. players
Barnet F.C. players
Aylesbury United F.C. players
Hayes F.C. players
Maidenhead United F.C. players
English Football League players
Footballers from Hammersmith
Association football midfielders
Black British lawyers
Black British sportspeople